Indirect presidential elections were held in Kosovo on 22 February 2011 and 7 April 2011.

Background
As stipulated in the coalition agreement between the Democratic Party of Kosovo (PDK) and the New Kosovo Alliance (AKR), the AKR's leader Behgjet Pacolli was to be elected president by the coalition's MPs. However, not all members of the PDK were in favour of this.

Election

First vote
It took three rounds of voting for Pacolli to be elected; he got 54, 58 and 62 votes respectively. Only 67 MPs were present, with the 53 opposition MPs boycotting the election.

Resignation of Pacolli
The election was declared unconstitutional by the Constitutional Court on 28 March 2011 with a vote of 7 to 2, as the necessary quorum had not been reached in the first two rounds. Pacolli resigned on 30 March 2011 and was again replaced as Acting President by Jakup Krasniqi, the Assembly's speaker.

Second vote
In a second vote on April 7, the PDK, AKR, and the opposition Democratic League of Kosovo agreed on a compromise candidate: police commander Atifete Jahjaga. She was elected with 80 votes of the 100 MPs present.

It was also agreed that she would only serve on an interim basis, with a direct presidential election planned for 2012 after the necessary constitutional changes have passed. The Constitutional Court however, ruled against shortening the term of the sitting president. and Jahjaga sat for the full term of five years.

A decision was also made to hold early parliamentary elections in early 2013, which was later held in 2014.

References

Presidential elections in Kosovo
Kosovo
Presidential election
History of the Republic of Kosovo
Annulled elections
February 2011 events in Europe